Scottish churches may refer to:
Church architecture in Scotland
Religion in Scotland